John Batki is an American short story writer, poet, and translator.

Life
Batki was born in Hungary in 1942, and has been living in the United States since 1957.
He has taught at Harvard University.

Batki's work has appeared in The New Yorker.

He has collected weavings and textiles since 1975.

Awards
 1972 O. Henry Award
 1975 MacDowell Fellowship
 1993 Fulbright Fellowship
 1995-6 Fellow, Collegium Budapest Institute for Advanced Study
 2003 Translation Grant, National Endowment for the Arts, Washington, D.C.

Works

Stories
 Never Touch a Butterfly | The New Yorker | May 1970
 Strange-Dreaming Charlie... | The New Yorker | 1971
 This Life in Green | The New Yorker | 1972
 At the National Festival | FICTION | 1972

Essays

And Not a Soul in the Streets | www.hlo.hu

Poetry

Translations

References

20th-century American poets
Hungarian translators
Hungarian emigrants to the United States
Harvard University faculty
Living people
20th-century American translators
American male poets
International Writing Program alumni
O. Henry Award winners
20th-century American short story writers
20th-century American male writers
Hungarian–English translators
1942 births